The 2009 NPF Senior Draft is the sixth annual NPF Draft.  It was held February 17, 2009 7:00 PM EST, hosted by the Akron Racers at the Cambria Suites Akron-Canton Airport location for the 2009 season.  It was streamed live on TheSoftballChannel.com.  The first selection was Arizona State's Kaitlin Cochran, picked by the Akron Racers.Athletes are not allowed by the NCAA to sign professional contracts until their collegiate seasons have ended.

After the draft, but before the season began, the Washington Glory ceased operations for financial reasons.  Subsequently, NPF and United States Specialty Sports Association(USSSA) began a partnership, which resulted in the expansion team USSSA Pride inheriting the Glory's player contracts and draft choices.

2009 NPF Draft

Following are the 25 selections from the 2009 NPF Senior Draft:

Position key: 
C = Catcher; UT = Utility infielder; INF = Infielder; 1B = First base; 2B =Second base SS = Shortstop; 3B = Third base; OF = Outfielder; RF = Right field; CF = Center field; LF = Left field;  P = Pitcher; RHP = right-handed Pitcher; LHP = left-handed Pitcher; DP =Designated player
Positions are listed as combined for those who can play multiple positions.

Round 1

Round 2

Round 3

Round 4

Round 5

References 

2009 in softball
National Pro Fastpitch drafts